The Rhodesia Prison Service (RPS) was a law enforcement agency of Rhodesia. A subdivision of the Rhodesian Security Forces, it was responsible for the administration of the Rhodesian prison system. Established in 1954 as the Southern Rhodesia Prison Department and incorporated into the federal prison service of the Federation of Rhodesia and Nyasaland, it continued as the prison service of independent Rhodesia during the UDI period. Upon Zimbabwe's independence in 1980, it was dissolved and superseded by the Zimbabwe Prison Services.

The RPS was led by the director of prisons, who was assisted by a deputy director and an assistant director. The first director of prisons was David Cameron in 1954, and the final officeholder was Frank Leslie Patch, serving from 1968 to 1980.

History 
Prior to 1954, prisons in Southern Rhodesia were administered by the Southern Rhodesia Prison Department (SRPD). On 30 November 1954, the Federal Assembly of the Federation of Rhodesia and Nyasaland passed the Prisons Department Act (49/1954), which incorporated the SRPD into the Federal Prison Service (FPS), effective 1 December 1954. This arrangement continued until December 1963, when the Federation of Rhodesia and Nyasaland dissolved and autonomy was returned to the individual colonies of Southern Rhodesia, Northern Rhodesia, and Nyasaland, the latter two of which gained independence in 1964 as Zambia and Malawi, respectively. From 1963, the service continued as the Southern Rhodesia Prison Service (SRPS). In 1965, shortly before Rhodesia's unilateral declaration of independence from the United Kingdom, the SRPS began using the name Rhodesia Prison Service.

In 1980, upon Zimbabwe's independence, the RPS was dissolved and superseded by the Zimbabwe Prisons and Correctional Service.

Organizational structure

Administration and personnel 
The headquarters of the Rhodesia Prison Service was located at the corner of Fourth Street and Jameson Avenue (today renamed Samora Machel Avenue).

Prison system 
The Rhodesia Prison Service administered more than 40 prisons.

Seal and flag 
The seal of the Rhodesia Prison Service consists of a yellow lion with a red tongue and white claws, standing on a horizontal white bar. The background color of the circular emblem in which the lion stands is light green. Above the circle is the Zimbabwe Bird, of gold color and outlined in dark brown. Rising vertically through the center of the circle is a sheathed sword inlaid with silver design and with a black point. The hilt of the sword consisted of a gold guard and pommel, and a black and white grip. Curved around the edge of the interior of the circle are the words "Rhodesia Prison Service" in white color. The lines of the circle are black, there are two white circular borders: one around the lion, and another serving as the exterior border of the emblem. Below the circle, just beneath the hilt of the sword, is the red and yellow flower of the flame lily, Rhodesia's national flower.

The flag of the Rhodesia Prison Service was a light green flag, of 2:1 proportions, with the RPS emblem in the center. The RPS emblem and flag were designed by Alan Simpson.

References 

Defunct law enforcement agencies
Prison Service
Prison and correctional agencies
1954 establishments in the Federation of Rhodesia and Nyasaland
1954 establishments in Southern Rhodesia
1980 disestablishments in Zimbabwe
Government agencies established in 1954
Government agencies disestablished in 1980
Law enforcement agencies of Zimbabwe